British Columbia Ferry Services Inc., operating as BC Ferries (BCF), is a former provincial Crown corporation, now operating as an independently managed, publicly owned Canadian company. BC Ferries provides all major passenger and vehicle ferry services for coastal and island communities in the Canadian province of British Columbia. Set up in 1960 to provide a similar service to that provided by the Black Ball Line and the Canadian Pacific Railway, which were affected by job action at the time, BC Ferries has become the largest passenger ferry line in North America, operating a fleet of 41 vessels with a total passenger and crew capacity of over 27,000, serving 47 locations on the B.C. coast.

The federal and provincial governments subsidize BC Ferries to provide agreed service levels on essential links between the BC mainland, coastal islands, and parts of the mainland without road access. The inland ferries operating on British Columbia's rivers and lakes are not run by BC Ferries. The responsibility for their provision rests with the British Columbia Ministry of Transportation, which contracts operation to various private sector companies.

Structure 
At its inception, BC Ferries was a division of the British Columbia Toll Highways and Bridges Authority, a provincial Crown corporation. Through successive reorganizations, it evolved into the British Columbia Ferry Authority and then the British Columbia Ferry Corporation, both of which were also provincial Crown corporations. In 2003, the Government of British Columbia announced that BC Ferries, which had been in debt, would be reorganized into a private corporation, implemented through the passage of the Coastal Ferry Act (Bill 18–2003). The single voting share of BC Ferries Corporation is held by the provincial government's BC Ferry Authority, which operates under the rules of the Act.

History
In the summer of 1958, a strike by employees of CP Steamships and the Black Ball Line caused the Social Credit government of W. A. C. Bennett to decide that the coastal ferry service in British Columbia needed to be government-owned, and so it set about creating BC Ferries. Minister of Highways Phil Gaglardi was tasked with overseeing the new Crown corporation and its rapid expansion.

BC Ferries' first route, commissioned in 1960, was between Swartz Bay, north of Sidney on Vancouver Island, and Tsawwassen, an area in Delta, using just two vessels. These ships were the now-retired MV Tsawwassen and the MV Sidney. The next few years saw a dramatic growth of the B.C. ferry system as it took over operations of the Black Ball Line and other major private companies providing vehicle ferry service between Vancouver Island and the Lower Mainland. As the ferry system expanded and started to service other small coastal communities, BC Ferries had to build more vessels, many of them in the first five years of its operations, to keep up with the demand. Another method of satisfying increasing demand for service was BC Ferries' unique "stretch and lift" program, involving seven vessels being cut in half and extended, and five of those vessels later cut in half again and elevated, to increase their passenger and vehicle-carrying capacities. The vast majority of the vessels in the fleet were built in B.C. waters, with only two foreign purchases and one domestic purchase. In the mid-1980s, BC Ferries took over the operations of the saltwater branch of the B.C. Ministry of Transportation and Highways, which ran ferry services to very small coastal communities. This action dramatically increased the size of BC Ferries' fleet and its geographical service area. The distinctive "dogwood on green" flag that BC Ferries used between 1960 and 2003 gave the service its popular nickname "the Dogwood Fleet".

During the 1990s, the NDP government commissioned a series of three fast ferries to improve ferry service between the Mainland and Vancouver Island. The ships proved problematic when they suffered many technical issues and cost double what was expected. The fast ferries were eventually sold off for $19.4 million in 2003.

A controversy began in July 2004 when BC Ferries, under a new American CEO, announced that the company had disqualified all Canadian bids to build three new  ships, and only the proposals from European shipyards were being considered. The contract was estimated at $542 million for the three ships, each designed to carry 370 vehicles and 1600 passengers.

The argument for domestic construction of the ferries was that it would employ numerous British Columbia workers, revitalize the sagging B.C. shipbuilding industry, and entitle the provincial government to a large portion of the cost in the form of taxes. BC Ferries CEO David Hahn claimed that building the ferries in Germany would "save almost $80 million and could lead to lower fares."

On September 17, 2004, BC Ferries awarded the vessel construction contract to Germany's Flensburger shipyard. The contract protected BC Ferries from any delays through a fixed price and fixed schedule contract.  entered service in March 2008, while  was delivered the same month and entered service in June. The third ship, has been delivered and is now in service as well.

On August 18, 2006, BC Ferries commissioned Flensburger to build a new vessel for its Inside Passage route, with the contract having many of the same types of terms as that for the Coastal-class vessels. The new northern service vessel, has been delivered.

On August 26, 2012, BC Ferries announced that it would be cutting 98 round trips on its major routes starting in the fall and winter of 2012 as part of a four-year plan to save $1 million on these routes. Service cuts have included the elimination of supplementary sailings on the Swartz Bay–Tsawwassen route, 18 round trips on the Horseshoe Bay–Departure Bay route, and 48 round trips, the largest number of cuts, on the Duke Point–Tsawwassen route, with plans to look for savings on the smaller unprofitable routes in the future.

Free ferry trips for seniors were suspended from April 2014 to April 2018.

In the fall of 2014, BC Ferries announced the addition of three new Intermediate-class ferries to phase out Queen of Burnaby and Queen of Nanaimo. These three vessels were to be named the Salish Class; Salish Orca, Salish Eagle and Salish Raven. In 2022, the Salish Heron, the fourth Salish Class vessel entered service. All four ferries were designed and built by Remontowa Shipbuilding S.A. in Gdansk, Poland, and are dual-fuel, capable of operating on liquefied natural gas and marine diesel. These vessels are a part of BC Ferries standardized fleet plan, which will take the number of ship class in the BC Ferries fleet from 17 to 5. BC Ferries has stated that total standardization of the BC Ferries fleet will not be complete for another 40 years.

Financial results

Current routes

Patronage
Route numbers are used internally by BC Ferries. All routes except 13 and 55 allow vehicles.

Figures displayed are annual vehicle equivalent and annual passengers.

Route 1 – Georgia Strait South (Highway 17): Swartz Bay to Tsawwassen

Route 2 – Georgia Strait Central (Highway 1): Nanaimo (via Departure Bay) to Horseshoe Bay

Route 3 – Howe Sound: Langdale to Horseshoe Bay

Route 4 – Satellite Channel: Swartz Bay to Saltspring Island (at Fulford Harbour)

Route 5 – Swanson Channel: Swartz Bay to the Southern Gulf Islands (Galiano, Mayne, Pender, and Saturna Islands)

Route 6 – South Stuart Channel: Crofton to Saltspring Island (at Vesuvius)

Route 7 – Jervis Inlet (Highway 101): Earls Cove to Saltery Bay

Route 8 – Queen Charlotte Channel: Horseshoe Bay to Bowen Island (at Snug Cove)

Route 9 – Active Pass Shuttle: Tsawwassen to the Southern Gulf Islands (Galiano, Mayne, Pender and Saltspring Islands)

Route 10 – Inside Passage: Port Hardy to Prince Rupert (with stops at Bella Bella and Klemtu)
Route 10 Supplemental: servicing Bella Bella, Shearwater, Ocean Falls and Bella Coola (as of mid-2014)

Route 11 – Hecate Strait (Highway 16): Prince Rupert to Haida Gwaii (via Skidegate)

Route 12 – Saanich Inlet: Brentwood Bay to Mill Bay

Route 13 – Thornbrough Channel: Langdale to Gambier Island (via New Brighton) and Keats Island (via Keats Landing and Eastbourne). (Foot passengers only, no vehicles). (Operated by Kona Winds Yacht Charters Ltd.)

Route 17 – Georgia Strait North: Powell River (via Westview) to Comox (via Little River)

Route 18 – Malaspina Strait: Powell River to Texada Island (via Blubber Bay)

Route 19 – Northumberland Channel: Nanaimo Harbour to Gabriola Island (via Descanso Bay)

Route 20 – North Stuart Channel: Chemainus to Thetis and Penelakut Islands

Route 21 – Baynes Sound: Buckley Bay to Denman Island (via Denman West)

Route 22 – Lambert Channel: Denman Island (via Gravelly Bay) to Hornby Island (via Shingle Spit)

Route 23 – Discovery Passage: Campbell River to Quadra Island (via Quathiaski Cove)

Route 24 – Sutil Channel: Quadra Island (via Heriot Bay) to Cortes Island (via Whaletown)

Route 25 – Broughton Strait: Port McNeill to Alert Bay (on Cormorant Island) and Sointula (on Malcolm Island)

Route 26 – Skidegate Inlet: Skidegate (on Graham Island) to Alliford Bay (on Moresby Island)

Route 28 – Discovery Coast: Port Hardy to Bella Coola (Commenced summer 2018) 

Route 30 – Mid-Island Express (Highway 19): Nanaimo (via Duke Point to Tsawwassen)

 Route 55 – Georgia Strait North-Central: French Creek to Lasqueti Island (via False Bay). (Foot passengers only, no vehicles) (Operated by Western Pacific Marine).
Unnumbered Route – Inside Passage: Prince Rupert to Port Simpson (also known as Lax Kw'alaams). (Operated by the Lax Kw'alaams First Nation community).

Maps
Numbers in blue circles are ferry route numbers. Provincial highway trailblazers are added where appropriate.

Fleet
BC Ferries has the largest fleet of vehicle ferry vessels in the world. There are 36 vessels, ranging from small 16-car ferries up to 470-car superferries. All of the vessels in use by BC Ferries are roll-on/roll-off car ferries. Most of the major vessels are based on similar designs, which are aggregated into classes of ferries:

Current vessels

Former vessels

 List of retired BC Ferries ships
 PacifiCat-class ferry

Future vessels
In 2019, BC started a $200 million program to acquire four hybrid/electric ferries (800 kWh each) to service three routes.

Accidents and incidents

The following is a summary of some of the incidents that have occurred involving BC Ferries vessels.

Queen of Alberni 
On August 9, 1979, Queen of Alberni was transiting through Active Pass when it ran aground on Galiano Island, tipping fifteen degrees to starboard. Several large commercial vehicles on board the vessel at the time were damaged. No persons were injured, but a racehorse on board died. This accident suspended all C-class vessels from travelling on Route 1 or any of the Southern Gulf Islands routes.

In June 1989, the vessel slammed into the loading dock at Departure Bay at about eight knots. Six people sustained slight injuries, including one who fell down a stairway. The ship received a scrape and some onboard vehicles were damaged.

On March 12, 1992, at 8:08am (16:08 UTC), Queen of Alberni collided with the Japanese freighter Shinwa Maru southwest of Tsawwassen. The collision occurred in heavy fog, with both vessels suffering minor damage. Injuries included 2 serious and 25 minor injuries for the 260 people on the ferry, while none of the 11 people aboard the freighter received injuries.

Queen of Burnaby
On August 25, 1966, the Queen of Burnaby broke her mooring at Departure Bay terminal while engines were being run in the early morning. The variable-pitch propellers were not left in the neutral position as was standard, and no crew was present on the bridge. The ferry was recovered after the anchor was dropped and the captain was shuttled to the vessel, and all sailing continued with no change of scheduling.

Queen of Coquitlam 
On October 19, 1980, Queen of Coquitlam sustained $3 million of damage on tipping in the Burrard Shipyard floating drydock.

In October, 1995, the vessel lost power and slammed into pilings at Horseshoe Bay, damaging its bow.

Queen of Cowichan
On August 12, 1985, three occupants were killed when Queen of Cowichan ran over a pleasure boat near the Horseshoe Bay terminal. The BC Court of Appeal found the Cowichan two thirds at fault and ordered that $500,000 in damages be paid.

On October 19, 2019, a crew member was significantly injured after being hit by the vessel's bow door which was having trouble opening at Horseshoe Bay terminal. The next round trip to Departure Bay and back was subsequently cancelled.

Queen of Cumberland
On April 18, 2018, Queen of Cumberland crew members were injured during a safety drill at Swartz Bay ferry terminal. When a hoist cable parted on the ship's davit, a rescue boat holding two occupants fell about  into the water. The boat was damaged and the individuals injured, one seriously.

Queen of the Islands 
On September 20, 1978, Queen of the Islands rammed the Saltery Bay dock causing $495,000 worth of damage.

Queen of Nanaimo 
On November 2, 2013, Queen of Nanaimo was pushed off course by severe weather as it was leaving the berth at Village Bay, Mayne Island. It damaged a private dock, and no one was injured. There was damage to the ship and all Tsawwassen–Gulf Islands sailings had to be cancelled while it was repaired.

Queen of New Westminster 
On October 20, 1971, Queen of New Westminster pulled out of its berth at the Departure Bay terminal while vehicle loading was in progress. A car and its two occupants fell into the water. Both of the vehicle's occupants were rescued.

In a similar incident, on August 13, 1992, the Queen of New Westminster pulled out of its berth at the Departure Bay terminal while vehicle loading ramps were still lowered and resting on the ship. Three people were killed, including two children, one was seriously injured, and two others received minor injuries when a van containing 6 people fell  from the upper deck onto the lower car deck and finally into the sea below. The van had been stopped and instructed to wait on the loading ramp by terminal crew members. The Transportation Safety Board of Canada determined that the accident was caused by the vessel not properly following departing procedures and secondarily due to poor communication between terminal and ship crew members.

Queen of the North
On December 17, 1974, the formerly named Queen of Surrey was withdrawn to repair damage from a fire in an electrical panel.

Two people from 100 Mile House went missing. BC Ferries CEO David Hahn said, "There is a real possibility that they went down with the ship." It is unlikely that it will be possible to salvage Queen of the North.

Officials have determined the cause of the accident was human error by three BC Ferries employees neglecting their navigational duties. Charges of criminal negligence causing death were considered, and a class action lawsuit for the passengers is proceeding while the Ferry and Marine Union seeks to reinstate the fired crew who failed to provide information to the $1 million TSB enquiry.

Queen of Oak Bay 
On June 30, 2005, at about 10:10 a.m. (17:10 UTC), the vessel Queen of Oak Bay, on the Nanaimo–Horseshoe Bay (Trans-Canada Highway) ferry route, lost power four minutes before it was to dock at the Horseshoe Bay terminal. The vessel became adrift, unable to change speed but able to steer with the rudders. The horn was blown steadily, and an announcement telling passengers to brace for impact was made minutes before the  ship slowly ran into the nearby Sewell's Marina, where it destroyed or damaged 28 pleasure crafts and subsequently went aground a short distance from the shore. No casualties or injuries were reported.

On July 1, 2005, BC Ferries issued a statement that Transport Canada, the Transportation Safety Board, and Lloyd's Register of Shipping were reviewing the control and mechanical systems on board to find a fault. An inspection revealed minimal damage to the ship, with only some minor damage to a metal fender, paint scrapes to the rudder, and some minor scrapes to one blade of a propeller.

On July 7, BC Ferries concluded that a missing cotter pin was to blame. The pin normally retained a nut on a linkage between an engine speed governor and the fuel control for one of the engines. Without the pin, the nut fell off and the linkage separated, causing the engine, clutches, and propellers to increase in speed until overspeed safety devices activated and shut down the entire propulsion system. The faulty speed governor had been serviced 17 days before the incident during a $35-million upgrade, and the cotter pin had not been properly replaced at that time.

Queen of Oak Bay was quickly repaired and tested at sea trials. She returned to regular service on July 8. A complete investigation report consisting of a 14-page Divisional Inquiry and a 28-page Engineering Incident Investigation was released in September 2006.

The Transportation Safety Board's Marine Investigation Report, released on September 6, 2007, indicated that "inadequacies in BC Ferries' procedures on safety-critical maintenance tasks and on ship handling during berthing operations" were major contributing factors to the accident. It appears that insufficient oversight of work done by contractors also played a role in the accident.

Queen of Prince Rupert 
On August 25, 1982, the MV Queen of Prince Rupert departed from McLoughlin Bay (Bella Bella, Campbell Island) several hours behind schedule, headed for Ocean Falls. In an effort to make up for some of the lost time, the captain ordered for the ship to be taken through Gunboat Passage, a narrow and dangerous shortcut. Gunboat Passage would have allowed for the vessel to entirely skip having to go south all the way around Denny Island, before going north again, up to Ocean Falls. This shortcut allows for a ship to sail between Denny Island and Cunningham Island, cutting the sailing time to Ocean Falls approximately in half.

When the Queen of Prince Rupert entered Gunboat Passage, several passengers aboard the ship went immediately to the Purser's Office to warn the crew that they were going the wrong way, down an unsafe passage. The Purser informed them that the captain knew what he was doing, and that everything was going as planned. Soon after, the ship ran aground in a particularly tight part of the channel. The captain quickly had the ship removed from the rock, then continued forward and ran aground again, on the same rock, further damaging the hull. This time, the ship would not budge, and the crew and passengers had to wait for 12 hours before being pulled away by a variety of tugboats, fishing boats, and a Coast Guard ship.

The captain turned the Queen of Prince Rupert around and opted to sail around Denny Island that time.

Queen of Saanich 
On the morning of February 6, 1992, Queen of Saanich and the passenger catamaran Royal Vancouver collided in heavy fog near the northern entrance of Active Pass. The bow doors of the Saanich were damaged. Aboard the Royal Vancouver, 23 passengers and four crew sustained largely minor injuries. Although both vessels were operating their radar systems, the Royal Vancouver was found negligent in this regard.

Queen of Surrey 
On August 29, 1982, Queen of Surrey rammed the Horseshoe Bay dock causing significant damage.

On May 12, 2003, the vessel was disabled as a result of an engine room fire. Queen of Capilano was dispatched and tethered to Queen of Surrey while tugboats were dispatched. The vessel was then towed back to shore. None of the 318 passengers were injured, but several crew members were treated for minor injuries. Some buckling of the main car deck resulted from the heat of the fire, but no vehicles were damaged in the incident.

On March 26, 2019, the 7:30am sailing from Horseshoe Bay of the vessel had an incident while docking at Langdale at 8:10am. The ship collided with a terminal structure and damaged its leading end. The bow of the ferry subsequently became lodged on the structure, causing severe delays, with all following vehicle sailings that day cancelled until the late evening, when relief could be provided. Passenger service was offered by water taxi for walk-in passengers.

Queen of Victoria
On August 2, 1970, the Soviet freighter Sergey Yesenin collided with Queen of Victoria in Active Pass, slicing through the middle of the ferry, days after its return to service following stretching. Three people were killed, and damage was estimated at over $1 million (1970 dollars). The Soviet ship did not have permission to be in Active Pass, and as such, the Soviet government compensated BC Ferries.

In 1972, while in Active Pass and within metres of the site of the 1970 collision, Queen of Victoria was disabled by a fire in the engine room.

Langdale Queen 
On January 23, 1966, Langdale Queen ran over a rowboat at Horseshoe Bay, on which both occupants survived.

Mayne Queen 
On November 7, 1995, Mayne Queen departed from Snug Cove and ran into a neighbouring marina, heavily damaging a floating dock in addition to 12 small pleasure boats, one of which sank. The crash was primarily attributed to human error and while transferring steering and power control from one control panel to the other located in the ship. The vessel's captain was also inexperienced with Mayne Queen and normally piloted other vessels. The captain then promptly left the scene of the accident after the incident without conducting a proper damage assessment.

On August 12, 1996, Mayne Queen departed Swartz Bay terminal and ran aground off Piers Island after losing steering control. The grounding occurred while performing a regular weekly test of the batteries for the steering control system. A crew member overheard there was going to be a test, and in an attempt to be helpful, and without direction, cut all power from the vessel's steering batteries, as he had done at night when the ship was stored. However, he did not realize that the test in question only required the removal of a battery charger and that his assistance was neither requested nor required. No one was injured in the incident, and the vessel was assisted off the rocks at high tide, but it suffered extensive damage to its propulsion system, having two of the four steering and propulsion pods for the right-angle drives sheared off and one of the two remaining pods suffering propeller damage.

Sechelt Queen 
On April 5, 1962, the formerly named Chinook ran aground on a submerged reef east of Snake Island in dense fog.

On July 17, 1962, a time-bomb, comprising three sticks of dynamite, likely planted by the Freedomites, destroyed a locker on the Chinook.

On July 14, 1974, Sechelt Queen collided with a pleasure craft in Active Pass, causing some damage, but did not stop to render assistance.

Vesuvius Queen 
In August, 1983, Vesuvius Queen rammed and substantially damaged the Saltspring Island dock.

Spirit of British Columbia
On July 27, 2005, a man travelling to Mayne Island missed his ferry, so he got on the Spirit of British Columbia and jumped off as the ferry was approaching Active Pass. The man refused rescue assistance from crew members, and was later banned from travelling with BC Ferries.

On April 27, 2019, the Spirit of British Columbia was damaged while docking at Tsawwassen ferry terminal during heavy winds.

Spirit of Vancouver Island 
On September 14, 2000, Spirit of Vancouver Island collided with the  Star Ruby while attempting to overtake the vessel in a narrow channel. Spirit of Vancouver Island struck Star Ruby on its port side, causing the pleasure craft to flip over and eventually right itself, though swamped and heavily damaged. According to the accident report, the pleasure craft ignored warning blasts from the approaching ferry and made a sharp turn towards the ferry just prior to impact. Two passengers aboard Star Ruby later died as a result of injuries sustained by the collision.

On July 21, 2003, Spirit of Vancouver Island collided with the dock at Swartz Bay. Four passengers suffered minor injuries. The accident caused tens of thousands of dollars of damage to the dock and the ship.

On October 9, 2009, a standby generator on Spirit of Vancouver Island caught fire on an early morning sailing out of Swartz Bay Terminal. No one was injured in the incident, but it caused major delays in the ferry system because of the already large volume of traffic for Thanksgiving weekend. Eight sailings were cancelled that day, and the ship remained out of service for the weekend.

On August 31, 2018, two crew members were injured during an early morning safety drill at Swartz Bay ferry terminal when the ship's davit malfunctioned, causing a rescue boat to flip, dropping the two occupants into the water.

On April 18, 2020, at 4:26pm (16:26 UTC), the vessel, travelling at an approximate speed of 5.4 knots, struck the concrete abutment on the wall of berth 3 at Tsawwassen ferry terminal. Although damage was minor, the offloading of vehicles on the upper car deck and foot passengers was delayed until 6:02pm. Passengers were required to disembark from the main car deck instead of the overhead walkway. Offloading of vehicles on the main car deck began at 8:58pm.

Coastal Celebration
An investigation found that this was due to an error on the bridge. No one was hurt in the incident. However, damage to Coastal Celebration and the berth at Swartz Bay cost CAN$470,000.

On November 4, 2015, while the ship was sailing from Tsawwassen to Swartz Bay, a man launched one of Coastal Celebrations 100-person life rafts and jumped overboard. The man then swam to Galiano Island while the ferry recovered the life raft and launched rescue craft to recover the man. The man was later arrested on the island.

On December 17, 2018, the Coastal Celebration rescued a man from a sinking vessel near Moresby Passage in dark and stormy conditions. All remaining sailings from Tsawwassen to Swartz Bay were cancelled that night.

Coastal Inspiration
On December 20, 2011, at 14:50 (21:50 UTC), Coastal Inspiration crashed into the Duke Point terminal, causing minor injuries to one passenger and crew member. The collision damaged the loading ramp, and foot passengers were held up for an hour before being unloaded; the vessel was rerouted to Departure Bay to unload its vehicle traffic. An electrical component failure in the propulsion control system was blamed for the crash. The ferry was taken out of service for repairs before resuming service on January 20, 2012. The damage caused the Duke Point terminal to be closed for five months, resulting in all services from Tsawwassen being rerouted into Departure Bay. The terminal reopened for service on May 1, 2012.

Mill Bay 
On May 29, 1989, Mill Bay ran aground near the Mill Bay dock.

Quinsam
On January 9, 2007, Quinsam was loading traffic from Nanaimo to Gabriola Island when it unexpectedly pulled out of its berth. A pickup truck on the boarding ramp plunged into the water below. Ferry workers were able to warn the truck's lone occupant, who was able to escape before the vehicle fell.

In film

See also

Other ferry services
Barnston Island Ferry – a ferry operated by the BC Ministry of Transportation
Black Ball Line
Kootenay Lake Ferry – a ferry in the British Columbia interior operated by the BC Ministry of Transportation

Ferry services elsewhere
Alaska Marine Highway – Alaska's Marine Highway System, similar to BC Ferries. Also serves Prince Rupert.
Inter-Island Ferry Authority
Marine Atlantic – An east-coast analogue of BC Ferries.
Washington State Ferries

Shipyards
Allied Shipbuilders Ltd.
Burrard Dry Dock
Vancouver Shipyard
Victoria Machinery Depot
Washington Marine Group – Originally called the Vancouver Shipyards Co. Ltd.
Yarrow Shipbuilders

References

Citations

References 
 Bannerman, Gary and Patricia. The Ships of British Columbia – An Illustrated History of the British Columbia Ferry Corporation. Surrey: Hancock House Publishers, 1985

Press releases 

BC Ferries Corporation (June 13, 2005). Upgraded Queen of Oak Bay Returns to Service . Press Release.
BC Ferries Corporation (June 30, 2005). Queen of Oak Bay Loses Power and Runs Aground . Press Release.
BC Ferries Corporation (June 30, 2005). Update on Queen of Oak Bay Grounding Incident . Press Release.
BC Ferries Corporation (July 1, 2005). Investigation into Queen of Oak Bay Incident Continues . Press Release.
BC Ferries Corporation (July 3, 2005). BC Ferries to Meet with Horseshoe Bay Boat Owners . Press Release.
BC Ferries Corporation (July 5, 2005). Queen of Oak Bay to Undergo Extensive Sea Trials . Press Release.
BC Ferries Corporation (July 7, 2005). Preliminary Investigation into Queen of Oak Bay Incident Released . Press Release.
BC Ferries Corporation (March 22, 2006). Queen of the North grounded and sank . Press Release.

External links

 
 BC Ferries Tracking – realtime vessel positions
 West Coast Ferries Discussion Forum
 BC Ferry & Marine Workers Union
 BC Ferries Commission
 BC Ferries and Ships on the BC Coast (very extensive photo galleries)

 
Transport in Greater Vancouver
Companies based in Victoria, British Columbia
Transport companies established in 1960
Coast of British Columbia
Former Crown corporations of Canada
1960 establishments in British Columbia
Water transport in British Columbia